The Hymenoptera Genome Database (HGD) is a comprehensive resource supporting genomics of Hymenoptera.

References

External links
 

Genome database
Biological databases